The 2022 Bowling Green Falcons football team represented Bowling Green State University during the 2022 NCAA Division I FBS football season. The Falcons were led by fourth-year head coach Scot Loeffler and played their home games at Doyt Perry Stadium in Bowling Green, Ohio. They competed as members of the East Division of the Mid-American Conference (MAC).

Schedule

Game summaries

at UCLA

Eastern Kentucky

Marshall

at Mississippi State

at Akron

Buffalo

Miami (OH)

at Central Michigan

Western Michigan

Kent State

at Toledo

at Ohio

vs. New Mexico State (Quick Lane Bowl)

Coaching staff

References

Bowling Green
Bowling Green Falcons football seasons
Bowling Green Falcons football